Alexander of Hierapolis may refer to two different bishops of two different cities:

Alexander of Hierapolis (Phrygia) (fl. 253), a bishop of Hierapolis in Phrygia (modern Pamukkale)
Alexander of Hierapolis (Syria) (fl. 431), a Nestorian bishop of Hierapolis Bambyce in Syria (modern Manbij)